John Francis Howard (October 15, 1909 – September 14, 1983) was a Canadian professional ice hockey player who played two games in the National Hockey League for the Toronto Maple Leafs during the 1936–37 season. The rest of his career, which lasted from 1933 to 1945, was spent in various minor leagues. He was born in London, Ontario. He died at Memorial Hospital in Cambridge, Ontario in 1983.

Career statistics

Regular season and playoffs

References

External links
 

1909 births
1983 deaths
Canadian ice hockey defencemen
Ice hockey people from Ontario
Los Angeles Monarchs players
Ontario Hockey Association Senior A League (1890–1979) players
Pasadena Panthers players
Pittsburgh Hornets players
St. Louis Flyers (AHA) players
Sportspeople from London, Ontario
Springfield Indians players
Syracuse Stars (AHL) players
Syracuse Stars (IHL) players
Toronto Maple Leafs players